Seong-gi or Sung-ki is a Korean masculine given name. The meaning differs based on the hanja used to write each syllable of the name. There are 27 hanja with the reading "seong" and 68 hanja with the reading "ki" on the South Korean government's official list of hanja which may be used in given names. It was the ninth-most-popular name for newborn boys in 1940, according to South Korean government data.

The name is not commonly given to babies with the family name Nam, as the resulting name "Nam Sung-ki" (남성기) is a homograph and homophone of the Korean word for penis. The 2005 Seoul Broadcasting System television series Hello My Teacher was criticised for its inclusion of a character with the gag name Nam Sung-ki, for this reason; some commentators believed this penis joke was inappropriate for television.

People with this name include:
Choi Buk (fl. 1755–1785), courtesy name Seong-gi, Joseon Dynasty painter
Ahn Sung-ki (born 1952), South Korean actor
Cho Sung-ki (born 1951), South Korean writer
Jung Sung-ki (born 1971), South Korean baseball player
Kim Song-gi (born 1988), Zainichi Korean football player
Yoo Seong-gi (born 1991), South Korean football player

See also
List of Korean given names

References

Korean masculine given names